Thomas Ray Richeson (September 27, 1923 – April 1, 2003) was a football player, head coach and businessman. He was born and raised in Russellville, Alabama before he served in the U.S. Army Air Corps during World War II. After his service, he earned a degree from the University of Alabama where he also played on the football team from 1946 through 1948 when he was a team captain. After he graduated, Richeson was taken in the tenth round of the 1948 NFL Draft by the Philadelphia Eagles, but ultimately played the 1949 season with the Chicago Hornets.

Following his playing career, Richeson began his coaching career. After one season at Meridian Junior College, he was hired as the head coach at Livingston State College (now the University of West Alabama). From 1953 through the 1956 season he compiled an overall record of four wins, 31 losses and one tie during his tenure there (4–31–1). Following his tenure at Livingston, Richeson ended his coaching career and entered the private sector through his retirement in 1988.

Head coaching record

References

1923 births
2003 deaths
Alabama Crimson Tide football players
Chicago Hornets players
West Alabama Tigers football coaches
Junior college football coaches in the United States
United States Army personnel of World War II
United States Army Air Forces soldiers
People from Russellville, Alabama